Peroidas or Peroedas, son of Menestheus, was hipparch  of the ile of Hetairoi from Anthemus from the beginning of the campaign of Alexander the Great. At the Battle of Issus, his squadron was transferred, along with that of Pantordanus, from the left to the right wing before the battle began (Arrian 2.9.3).

References 

Who's Who in the Age of Alexander the Great, by Waldemar Heckel 

Hetairoi
Ancient Macedonian generals